Chad Boat (born January 30, 1992) is an American professional dirt track racing driver and team owner. The son of former driver Billy Boat, he has raced in Indy Lights and NASCAR.

Racing career

Sprint cars and midgets
Boat began his racing career in quarter midgets at the age of five. At age seven, he won the Arizona state quarter midget championship, and the following year won the Light Modified and Light 160 midget championships.

Stock cars
After competing in USAC competition, Boat moved to NASCAR in 2010, running in seven K&N Pro Series West events between 2010 and 2012, with a best finish of fourth in 2010 at Iowa Speedway; he also ran 19 K&N Pro Series East events with a best finish of ninth at Bowman Gray Stadium in 2011. Boat also competed in ten ARCA Racing Series events in 2012 and 2013, posting third-place finishes twice at Iowa.

In January 2014, Boat announced that he would be competing for Rookie of the Year in the Nationwide Series in 2014, running 15 events for family-owned Billy Boat Motorsports. Boat finished 29th in points with a best finish of 22nd at Iowa Speedway. In 2015 he raced in both the Xfinity (formerly Nationwide) Series and Camping World Truck Series for Billy Boat Motorsports. He made 3 Xfinity starts and 4 truck series starts. He ran for the Truck Series championship and finished 38th in points with a best finish of ninth at Talladega Superspeedway, his best NASCAR finish to date.

Indy Lights
On June 27, 2017 it was announced that Boat would compete in the Indy Lights series with Belardi Auto Racing competing at the oval events at Iowa Speedway and Gateway Motorsports Park in the latter half of the 2017 season. Chad's father Billy also competed in Indy Lights, then called the American Racing Series, in 1986 and 1987.

Team ownership
Boat co-owned a USAC National Midget car team Tucker/Boat Motorsports and the team won the 2020 championship in their first season with driver Chris Windom. With the championship, Boat became the first person who had won a USAC National Midget race to own the season-championship-winning car with another driver.

Personal life
Boat attended University of North Carolina at Charlotte, majoring in finance.

Boat married Casey Haimes on January 26, 2019. Casey is a co-host of the podcast Door Bumper Clear on Dirty Mo Media. The couple has a daughter, Chloe, who was born in 2020.

Motorsports career results

NASCAR
(key) (Bold – Pole position awarded by qualifying time. Italics – Pole position earned by points standings or practice time. * – Most laps led.)

Xfinity Series

Camping World Truck Series

K&N Pro Series East

K&N Pro Series West

ARCA Racing Series
(key) (Bold – Pole position awarded by qualifying time. Italics – Pole position earned by points standings or practice time. * – Most laps led.)

 Season still in progress
 Ineligible for series points

Indy Lights

References

External links
 
 

Living people
1992 births
Racing drivers from Phoenix, Arizona
Indy Lights drivers
NASCAR drivers
USAC Silver Crown Series drivers
Belardi Auto Racing drivers